Nyisho Gewog (Dzongkha: ཉི་ཤོག་) is a gewog (village block) of Wangdue Phodrang District, Bhutan.

References

Gewogs of Bhutan
Wangdue Phodrang District